Laxmi Prasad Sihare was an Indian civil service officer, curator, art writer and the director-general of the National Gallery of Modern Art (NGMA). It was during his directorship, an art exhibition on Auguste Rodin was organized by the museum.

Sihare joined NGMA as the director-general in 1984. One of his main contributions was his timely intervention in stopping the 1995 public auction of the Jewels of the Nizams, which included the Jacob Diamond, an uncut diamond ranked fifth in the world in size. He obtained a court order in 1979 and stopped the auction of the jewels to buyers which included bidders from abroad. He published a number of books and monographs, including Oriental influences on Wassily Kandinsky and Piet Mondrian : 1909-1917, Paul Klee : sixty oil paintings, water colours, pastels and drawings (1909-1939), Restoration of oil painting : techniques and Computer art. The Government of India awarded him the Padma Bhushan, the third highest civilian award, in 1987.

Sihare retired from government service in 1991 and died in 1993.

See also

 Nizam of Hyderabad
 Jaipur House

References

Further reading

External links
 

Recipients of the Padma Bhushan in civil service
1993 deaths
Indian Administrative Service officers
Indian art curators
Indian art writers
1929 births